The Lusca Fantastic Film Fest (formerly Puerto Rico Horror Film Fest) is an annual film festival held in Puerto Rico. It is the first and only international fantastic film festival in the Caribbean devoted to sci-fi, thriller, fantasy, dark humor, bizarre, horror, anime, adventure, virtual reality and animation in short and feature films. The event is held in San Juan, Puerto Rico metropolitan area, and other venues throughout the island of Puerto Rico. It runs for eight days during two weeks during October and November. Its main objective is to promote cinematographic art by presenting high-quality  short and feature films.

History 
The festival was started in 2006, and took the form of a competitive festival in 2009. It is sponsored by Scene 51, Inc. and the Puerto Rico Film Academy since 2007.  In 2011, MovieMaker Magazine commented that the Puerto Rico Horror Film Fest was one of the “13 Horror Film Festivals to Die For.” In 2016 The Puerto Rico Horror Film Festival had a name change to LUSCA Caribbean International Fantastic Film Festival expanding to more film genres and adding anime, adventure, virtual reality and an animation competition. In 2016, the Puerto Rico Horror Film Fest became LUSCA Caribbean International Fantastic Film Fest,  retaining it identity in Lusca's Horror selections.[3]

Prominence
The Puerto Rico Horror Film Fest is a point of entry for movies that would otherwise not be shown in Puerto Rico due to the level of specialization of their genre. Since its inception, the Festival has grown in terms of programming, media relevance, and attendance. The festival is attended by over 7,000 people and features an average of over 200 films. It is part of "La Alianza Latinoamericana de Festivales de Cine Fantástico", one of Latin America's main horror film festivals.

Awards 
The festival has been the recipient of the following awards.
 Best International Feature Film
 Best International Short Film
 Best International Director
 Best International Animation
 Best VR Project
 International Short Film Audience Award
 Best Local Feature
 Best Local Short
 Best Local Director
 Best Local Animation
 Best Local Actor
 Best Local Actress
 Best Local Screenplay
 Best Local Special Effects
 Best Local Cinematography
 Best Local Editing
 Best Local Sound
 Local Audience Award
 Carlos Madera Excellence Award
 Lifetime Achievement Award
 Cosplay Contest - Jury Award
 Cosplay Contest - People's Choice Award
 Pet Cosplay Contest
 Fantastic Sreenwriting Contest
 Special Recognition
 Special Jury Award

International winners
For the complete list of winners visit: Past Editions

Local winners
For the complete list of winners visit: Past Editions

International representation 
The global film community participates in the Festival, among they are: Argentina, Australia, Brazil, Canada, Chile, Colombia, Costa Rica, Croatia, Cuba, Czech Republic, Dominican Republic, Estonia, Ethiopia, France, Germany, Hong Kong, Iceland, Ireland, Israel, Italy, Japan, Mexico, Morocco, New Zealand, Pakistan, Panama, Peru, Philippines, Portugal, Puerto Rico, Russia, Scotland, Serbia, South Korea, Spain, Sweden, Switzerland, United States of America, United Arab Emirates, United Kingdom, Uruguay, Venezuela.

Notable celebrities 
Some of the best known names in the film industry have participated in the PRHFF, including Zelda Rubinstein (Poltergeist) 2009, Tony Todd 2011(Candyman), Tippi Hedren in 2013, and Lloyd Kaufman in 2016, all of them awarded by the festival's Lifetime Achievement Award.

Past editions 
Puerto Rico Horror Film Fest 2007
Puerto Rico Horror Film Fest 2009
Puerto Rico Horror Film Fest 2011
Puerto Rico Horror Film Fest 2013 - Celebrated the 50th anniversary of "The Birds" and had Tippi Hedren as a special guest, honoring her with the Lifetime Achievement Award.
Puerto Rico Horror Film Fest 2014 - The festival celebrated the 30th Anniversary of A Nightmare on Elm Street and had a special screening of the original film.
Puerto Rico Horror Film Fest 2015 
Puerto Rico Horror Film Fest 2016 
Lusca Fantastic Film Fest 2017 
Lusca Fantastic Film Fest 2018

References

External links 
 Official Website

Puerto Rican culture
2006 establishments in Puerto Rico
Recurring events established in 2006